G. E. M. Membership Department Stores was a chain of discount stores in the United States and Canada. The chain extended membership to direct and indirect government employees;  the name was an acronym for "Government Employees Mart."

Appliance and electronics departments in G.E.M. stores were operated by Wards Company, which later changed its name to Circuit City.

The stores closed during the discount store shakeout of 1973.

Canadian pharmacist Murray Koffler was an investor in the G.E.M. chain, bringing the first G.E.M. store to Toronto in 1959. He eventually subleased the G.E.M. drug department in several Toronto area stores. Following the G.E.M. discount model, Koffler later opened one of the first "big box" store chains, Shoppers Drug Mart.

On November 7, 1964, GEM opened its first store in the UK. This branch in West Bridgford, Nottingham was the first out-of-town superstore in the UK. GEM didn't actually sell anything, they rented out companies and then took a percentage of sales. Most of the departments in GEM were nation companies such as Boots or TIMES Furnishing.

References

Defunct discount stores of the United States
Defunct companies based in Detroit
Retail companies established in 1956
Retail companies disestablished in 1973